Wahab is a surname and a masculine given name. People with the name include:

Surname
A. Wahab, acting regent of Poso Regency, Central Sulawesi, Indonesia
Adewale Wahab, Nigerian footballer
Anisa Wahab, Afghan actress and singer
Bakri Wahab, Indonesian politician
Fauzia Wahab, Pakistani politician
Hamal Wahab, Pakistani cricketer
Mamta Wahab, Bangladeshi politician
Murtaza Wahab, Pakistani politician
Musa Wahab, Malaysian statesman
Qudus Wahab, Nigerian college basketball player
Rida Wahab,  Lebanese football player
Shaista Wahab, American Dari-language writer
Wahib Wahab, Indonesian statesman
Zarina Wahab, Indian actress

Given name
Wahab Ackwei, Ghanaian football player
Wahab Adams,  Ghanaian professional footballer
Wahab Adegbenro, Nigerian physician and statesman
Wahab Akbar, Filipino politician
Wahab Chaudhary, Indian politician from Uttar Pradesh
Wahab Dolah,  Malaysian politician
Wahab Dosunmu, Nigerian politician
Wahab Goodluck, Nigerian politician
Wahab Khar,  Kashmiri Sufi mystic poet and saint
Wahab Riaz,  Pakistani cricketer
Wahab Shah, Pakistani dancer, choreographer, actor, and director
Wahab Shinwari,  Afghan cricketer

See also
Abdul Wahab
Wahb